The following highways are numbered 504:

Costa Rica
 National Route 504

United States
Mississippi
  Mississippi Highway 504
  Pennsylvania Route 504

Territories
  Puerto Rico Highway 504